Dalhain is a commune in the Moselle department in Grand Est in north-eastern France.

The name Dalhain is of Germanic origins from the roots 'dal' meaning 'valley' and 'heim' meaning 'village'. The name is also recorded as Dalem, Dala, Dalehen and Dalcheim.

See also 
 Communes of the Moselle department

References

External links 
 

Communes of Moselle (department)